The 2004 Miami Hurricanes football team represented the University of Miami during the 2004 NCAA Division I-A football season. It was the Hurricanes' 79th season of football and 1st as a member of the Atlantic Coast Conference. The Hurricanes were led by fourth-year head coach Larry Coker and played their home games at the Orange Bowl. They finished the season 9–3 overall and 5–3 in the ACC to finish in a three-way tie for third place. They were invited to the Peach Bowl where they defeated Florida, 27–10.

Schedule

Game summaries
Notable games such as Rivalry and Ranked Games are listed below:

Miami opened the season ranked #5.

Florida State
Florida State was ranked #4 heading into the Friday night ABC televised game, Miami ranked #5 won 16 to 10 in Overtime upsetting FSU.

Louisville
Louisville was ranked #20 heading into the game, Miami ranked #3 won 41 to 38 in the Thursday Night ESPN televised game.

Source: ESPN

Virginia
Virginia was ranked #10 heading into this game, Miami ranked #18 won 31 to 21 in the ABC televised game.

Virginia Tech
Virginia Tech was ranked #10 heading into this game, Miami ranked #9 lost 10 to 16 in the ABC televised game.

Peach Bowl vs Florida
Florida was ranked #20 heading into this rivalry game at the Peach Bowl, Miami ranked #14 won 27 to 10. This led to a #11 ranking to close the season.

References

Miami
Miami Hurricanes football seasons
Peach Bowl champion seasons
Miami Hurricanes football